Nicklas Timfjord (born 18 March 1977) is a former professional tennis player from Sweden.

Career
As a junior, Timfjord reached a singles high of no. 11 in the world on the ITF Junior rankings and no. 10 in doubles. In 1996, Timfjord, along with Thomas Johansson and Mårten Renström, represented Sweden in the European Men's Team Championships (formerly known as the King's Cup). He won all his singles matches, as well as his doubles matches with Renström, helping Sweden to win the title.

He made his ATP main draw debut at the 1997 Swedish Open as a qualifier in the singles draw, losing to his compatriot, world number 36 and third seed Magnus Larsson. He and his partner, Henrik Andersson, also received a wild card into the Doubles draw, where they lost to the tournament third seeds, Mark Keil and Fernando Meligeni. Timfjord had two further appearances at the Swedish Open, in 1999 and 2000, losing in the first round on both occasions.

He mainly participated on the Futures circuit, reaching five singles final and winning three titles and has a career high ATP singles ranking of 261 achieved on 14 July 2008. He also has a career high ATP doubles ranking of 518 achieved on 10 February 1997.

ITF Futures Titles

Singles: (3)

Doubles: (4)

References

External links
 
 

1977 births
Living people
Swedish male tennis players
Sportspeople from Gothenburg